Christel Wilhelmina Boeljon (born 30 July 1987) is a professional golfer from the Netherlands, currently playing on the Ladies European Tour and the U.S.-based LPGA Tour.

Amateur career
Boeljon was born in Beverwijk. One day she joined her parents for a visit to the Golfclub Spaarnwoude, and two years later she gave up field hockey and concentrated on golf.  In 2005, she continued her studies in the United States and accepted a golf scholarship to Purdue University in Indiana. In her first 25 tournaments she played 24 rounds under par.

Highlights
 2002: won Mevrouw Swanebeker, won Dutch Junior Masters
 2003: won National Match Play U-21
 2004: runner-up National Stroke Play U-21, runner-up Stern Open
 2005: won National Stroke Play U-21, semi-finalist in British Ladies Amateur  
 2006: won Dutch International Junior Open at Toxandria
 2007: best Dutch player at the Dutch Ladies Open 
 2008: 8th at the Ladies Dutch Open at Eindhoven, won National Stroke Play

Professional career
Boeljon turned professional in 2009, when she returned from Purdue. She went to the Ladies European Tour's qualifying school in 2008, won the first stage and finished 4th at the final stage in 2009. She began well, she made the cut at the ANZ Ladies Masters in Australia and finished 41st.  In April, she won the European Ladies Golf Cup together with Marjet van der Graaff. In June she again won the National Stroke Play. She made the cut at the 2009 Women's British Open and finished 57th.

In 2011, she played her first major in the United States, the Kraft Nabisco Championship and finished 15th. A few weeks later she won the Turkish Airlines Ladies Open in Belek, then finished 2nd at the Ladies Slovak Open, which was good enough to become the leader of the Ladies European Tour money list.

Professional wins (4)

Ladies European Tour (4)

Results in LPGA majors
Results not in chronological order before 2015.

^ The Evian Championship was added as a major in 2013

CUT = missed the half-way cut
"T" = tied

Summary

Most consecutive cuts made – 5 (2011 Kraft Nabisco – 2012 LPGA)
Longest streak of top-10s – 0

Ladies European Tour career summary

 as of 2014 season

LPGA Tour career summary

official through the 2016 season

World ranking
Position in Women's World Golf Rankings at the end of each calendar year.

Team appearances
Amateur
European Ladies' Team Championship (representing Netherlands): 2005, 2007, 2008
Espirito Santo Trophy (representing Netherlands): 2006, 2008

Professional
European Ladies Golf Cup: 2009 (winner)
Solheim Cup (representing Europe): 2011 (winners)

Solheim Cup record

References

External links

Purdue Sports.com - women's golf - Christel Boeljon

Dutch female golfers
Purdue Boilermakers women's golfers
Ladies European Tour golfers
LPGA Tour golfers
Solheim Cup competitors for Europe
Sportspeople from Beverwijk
1987 births
Living people